Sagunto Power Station is a natural gas-fired combined-cycled power station in Sagunto near Valencia, Spain.  It went into operation in 2007. The power station is owned and operated by Unión Fenosa.

The power station consists of three identical units with an electrical power output of 1,212.6 MW. It was built and equipped by Siemens. Each of the units has an efficiency of 57%. The power station is connected via a 380 kV double-circuit powerline with Gauss substation. On the area of the facility at present, the static inverter of HVDC Cometa is under construction.

See also 
 List of power stations in Spain

External links 
 Central de ciclo combinado de Sagunto

Natural gas-fired power stations in Spain
Sagunto